L bar may refer to:
 Ł, character in several Slavic languages
 J-bar lift, type of ski and snowboarding lift
 A type of television news screen layout

Lbar may also refer to:
 LBAR (Limited area sine transform BARotropic), track model used by the Tropical cyclone forecast model